"Hero and Heroine" is a song by English band Strawbs featured on their 1974  album of the same name. It is written by Dave Cousins and has obvious drug allusions, the main reason it didn't get much airplay on BBC radio. The song is in a similar vein to an earlier track "Witchwood" but with rather more obvious allegory.

Dave Cousins originally demonstrated the song to the band on banjo and the guitar picking under the verses does indeed retain a bluegrass feel. Keyboardist John Hawken and guitarist Dave Lambert added mellotron and guitar power chords between the verses which gives the whole song a more epic bearing.

B-Side

The B-side track "Why" is another Dave Cousins composition, not released on any studio album. It forms the first part of the composite song "Why and Wherefore" which appears on the compilation/rarities album Halcyon Days.

Personnel

Dave Cousins – vocals, acoustic guitar
Dave Lambert – electric guitar
Chas Cronk – bass guitar
John Hawken – Mellotron, Hammond organ
Rod Coombes – drums

Sampling
The song was sampled by the producing duo Sid Roams for the beat "Intro/S.R. Anthem", in their album "Strictly Nstrmntl".

References
"Hero and Heroine" at Strawbsweb

External links
Lyrics to "Hero and Heroine" at Strawbsweb official site
Lyrics to "Why" at Strawbsweb official site

1974 singles
Strawbs songs
1974 songs
Songs written by Dave Cousins